Woodland is the name of multiple places in the U.S. state of Maine:
Woodland, Aroostook County, Maine
Woodland, Washington County, Maine